Tamarack is a common name for Larix laricina, a medium-size species of larch tree native to North America.

Tamarack may also refer to:

Trees
Tamarack pine, Pinus contorta

Places

Canada
Tamarack, Edmonton, Alberta
Tamarack, Ontario

United States
Tamarack, California, in Calaveras County
Tamarack, Michigan, an unincorporated community in Gogebic County
Tamarack City, Michigan, unincorporated community in Houghton County
Tamarack, Minnesota, incorporated place in Aitkin County
Tamarack, Wisconsin, unincorporated community
Upper Tamarack River, Minnesota
Lower Tamarack River, Minnesota
Little Tamarack River, Minnesota
Tamarack Lake, a lake in Minnesota
Tamarack River (Minnesota)
Tamarack River (Michigan)
Tamarack Swamp, Pennsylvania

Recreational areas
Camp Tamarack, California
Camp Tamarack, Indiana
Camp Tamarack, New Jersey
Camp Tamarack (Oregon)
Tamarack, Best of West Virginia, tourist attraction in Beckley, West Virginia
Tamarack Flat Campground, campground in Yosemite National Park, California
Tamarack Golf Club, Labrador City, Newfoundland and Labrador, Canada
Tamarack Resort, all-season resort southwest of Donnelly in Valley County, Idaho
Tamarack Ski Area (Troy, Idaho), defunct ski hill northwest of Troy in Latah County, Idaho

Other uses
Tamarack (band), Canadian folk group
Tamarack Developments Corporation, home builder in the Ottawa-Carleon region of Canada
Tamarack Microelectronics (1987–2002), Taiwan
Tamarack mine, Calumet, Michigan
Tamarack Peak, a mountain in Nevada
Tamarack Review, Canadian literary magazine
, a United States Navy patrol vessel in commission from 1917 to 1919

See also
 Tamarac (disambiguation)